The amphibians of Uruguay are diverse.

Species

 Argenteohyla siemersi
 Dendropsophus nanus
 Elachistocleis bicolor
 Hypsiboas pulchellus
 Leptodactylus podicipinus
 Limnomedusa macroglossa
 Lysapsus limellum
 Melanophryniscus pachyrhynus
 Pleurodema bibroni
 Pseudis minuta
 Pseudopaludicola falcipes
 Rhinella achavali
 Rhinella schneideri

See also
 Fauna of Uruguay

Uruguay
Amphibians

Uruguay